A list of films produced in Egypt in 1988. For an A-Z list of films currently on Wikipedia, see :Category:Egyptian films.

External links
 Egyptian films of 1988 at the Internet Movie Database
 Egyptian films of 1988 elCinema.com

Lists of Egyptian films by year
1988 in Egypt
Lists of 1988 films by country or language